Nick Bätzner (born 15 March 2000) is a German professional footballer who plays as a midfielder for Belgian First Division A club Oostende.

Club career
A youth product of VfB Stuttgart since the age of 12, Bätzner signed with Oostende in the summer of 2020. He made his professional debut with Oostende in a 2–2 Belgian First Division A tie with Genk on 28 September 2020.

References

External links

VFB Profile

1999 births
Living people
People from Ludwigsburg
Sportspeople from Stuttgart (region)
German footballers
Germany youth international footballers
Germany under-21 international footballers
Association football midfielders
Belgian Pro League players
Regionalliga players
K.V. Oostende players
VfB Stuttgart II players
German expatriate footballers
Expatriate footballers in Belgium
German expatriate sportspeople in Belgium
Footballers from Baden-Württemberg
21st-century German people